Clondalever is a townland in County Westmeath, Ireland. It is located about north–east of Mullingar.

Clondalever is one of 3 townlands of the civil parish of Kilpatrick in the barony of Fore in the Province of Leinster. The neighbouring townlands are: Kilpatrick to the north, Rickardstown to the north–east, Gigginstown to the south–east, Balreagh to the south, Clondalever to the south, Taghmon, to the south, Tuitestown to the west and Derrynagaragh to the north–west.

In the 1911 census of Ireland there were 6 houses and 22 inhabitants in the townland.

References

External links
Map of Clondalever at openstreetmap.org
Clondalever at The IreAtlas Townland Data Base
Clondalever at Townlands.ie
Clondalever at the Placenames Database of Ireland

Townlands of County Westmeath